Waru-Juanda Toll Road is a  highway connecting between Bundaran Waru, Sidoarjo, south of Surabaya with Juanda International Airport in Indonesia. This toll road crosses the area of Surabaya and Sidoarjo. The toll road is connected to the Surabaya-Mojokerto Toll Road and Surabaya-Porong Toll Road in the east. This highway is complementary to the Trans-Java Expressway. The toll road was inaugurated by President Susilo Bambang Yudhoyono in 2008 and operated by PT Citra Margatama Surabaya, a subsidiary of PT Citra Marga Nushapala Persada.

Toll gates

References 

Surabaya
Toll roads in Java
Transport in East Java